Callyspongia plicifera, the azure vase sponge, is a species of sea sponge belonging to the family Callyspongiidae. It is native to the Bahamas where it is found at a depth of 31.5-44.2 m. It was first described in 1814 by Jean-Baptiste Lamarck.

Characteristics

The azure vase sponge is a vase shaped demosponge  that grow up to 27 cm in height and 13.5 cm in diameter. Its outer surface consists of 0.5–1 cm deep rounded pits and grooves while the inner surface is smooth with 1–5 mm scattered openings. The vent at the top is up to 6.5 cm in diameter and has a thin, transparent collar. They are pink to purple in colour and fluoresce light blue.

References

Callyspongiidae
Animals described in 1814
Taxa named by Jean-Baptiste Lamarck